is a Japanese politician of the Liberal Democratic Party, a member of the House of Representatives in the Diet (national legislature). A native of Kōchi Prefecture and graduate of Waseda University, he was elected to the assembly of Kōchi Prefecture in 1985 (serving for one term) and then to the House of Representatives for the first time in 1990. Yamamoto is currently Minister of Agriculture, Forestry and Fisheries in the Abe cabinet.

Trans-Pacific Partnership
Yamamoto said during a speech at a fundraising party in support of Tsutomu Sato, the ruling Liberal Democratic Party's Diet affairs chief, that “Sato will decide whether or not we’ll force the passage" (of the TPP). Within days, Yamamoto withdrew the remarks and apologized.  However, the four main opposition parties pressed for his resignation over the comment.

References

External links
 .

1952 births
Living people
Members of the House of Representatives (Japan)
People from Kōchi, Kōchi
Waseda University alumni
Liberal Democratic Party (Japan) politicians
21st-century Japanese politicians